Michal Houžvička (born 8 August 1987) is a professional Czech football player who currently plays for FK Viktoria Žižkov.

References

Czech footballers
1987 births
Living people
Czech First League players
FK Viktoria Žižkov players

Association football midfielders